Brian Cohen (born March 20, 1976) is a retired American professional boxer and a current boxing manager.

During his professional boxing career, Cohen was ranked in the top 40 of the WBC and has held the WBC Continental Americas light heavyweight title. Cohen fought his last bout in 2010, fighting for the first time outside of USA in New Zealand. After retiring, Cohen became a manager, focusing on women boxers.

Notable boxers managed

 Cornelius Lock
 Melissa St. Vil
 Ronica Jeffrey
 Eileen Olszewski

Professional boxing titles
USA State Titles
USA Mid American light heavyweight title (174 Ibs)
USA Mid West light heavyweight title (174 Ibs)
USA Indiana State light heavyweight title (174 Ibs)
North American Boxing Council
NABC Light Heavyweight Title (174 Ibs)
C.A.M. Light Heavyweight Title (174 Ibs)
World Boxing Council
WBC Continental Americas light heavyweight title (169 Ibs)

Professional boxing record

References

1976 births
Living people
American male boxers
Light-heavyweight boxers
Super-middleweight boxers
Boxers from Philadelphia
Boxers managed by Brian Cohen